Ahsaas is a 1979 Hindi romantic film produced by G. P. Sippy and directed by Surinder Suri. The film introduced Parvez and Dina in lead roles. It also starred Shammi Kapoor, Shashi Kapoor, Simi Garewal, Simple Kapadia, Bindu, Amjad Khan in other roles. Rakesh Bedi also made his debut with this film. There are guest appearances by Amitabh Bachchan and Bindiya Goswami. The film's music is by Bappi Lahiri.

Music

External links 
 

1979 films
1970s Hindi-language films
Films scored by Bappi Lahiri